Byron Township may refer to:

 Byron Township, Ogle County, Illinois
 Byron Township, Buchanan County, Iowa
 Byron Township, Stafford County, Kansas, in Stafford County, Kansas
 Byron Township, Michigan
 Byron Township, Cass County, Minnesota
 Byron Township, Waseca County, Minnesota
 Byron Township, Cavalier County, North Dakota, in Cavalier County, North Dakota

Township name disambiguation pages